Baghcheh Jiq (also Romanized as Baghcheh Jīq) is a village in Almalu Rural District, Nazarkahrizi District, Hashtrud County, East Azerbaijan Province, Iran. At the 2006 census, its population was 73, in 12 families.

References 

Towns and villages in Hashtrud County